An election was held on November 4, 2008 to elect all 41 members to Delaware's House of Representatives. The election coincided with the elections for other offices, including U.S. President, U.S. Senate, U.S. House of Representatives, state governor and state senate. The primary election was held on September 9, 2008.

Democrats regained control of the House after 24 years after gaining seven seats, winning 25 seats compared to 16 seats for the Republicans.

Democratic Representative Dianna Williams (District 6) announced immediately after the election that she would be resigning. A special election was held on December 20, 2008 to fill the seat at which Tom Kovach gained the seat for the Republicans.

Results

Statewide

District
Results of the 2008 Delaware House of Representatives election by district:

References

House of Representatives
2008
Delaware House of Representatives